Sunnfjord ( - in contrast to Nordfjord) is a traditional district in Western Norway located in Vestland county. It includes the municipalities of Askvoll, Fjaler, the southernmost parts of Kinn, Sunnfjord, and the southernmost parts of Bremanger.

The central geographical characteristic of the Sunnfjord region are the fjords: Dalsfjorden and Førdefjorden. It is a tourist region, with waterfalls, fishing, white-water rafting, glaciers, hiking, and scenery–including Jostedalsbreen National Park.

The area was the site of the largest air battle over Norway during World War II, and a museum is dedicated to the event in Naustdal. There are two airports in Sunnfjord: Førde Airport, Bringeland, just outside the town of Førde, and Florø Airport, just outside the town of Florø. The European route E39 highway passes through the region, going north and south.

Notable residents

References

 
Districts of Vestland
Fjords of Vestland